The Concretes are a Swedish indie pop band from Stockholm, composed of eight members.

History
The Concretes began with Victoria Bergsman, Maria Eriksson, and Lisa Milberg. Since their formation in 1995, they have grown into an eight piece band. They have a number of "Honorary Concretes" who play on their records.

One of their songs from their debut album The Concretes, "Say Something New", has been featured on a number of television advertisements in the United States for Target. "You Can't Hurry Love", also from their debut album, has been used in major motion pictures and other films. Their second album, In Colour, was released in 2006. It was followed shortly after by the departure of lead singer Victoria Bergsman, who has since moved on to her solo project, Taken By Trees. Lisa Milberg now provides lead vocals for the band, both on stage and on the band's third album Hey Trouble, released early 2007.

In 2007, The Concretes recorded a cover version of Take That's "Back for Good" for Engine Room Recordings' compilation album Guilt by Association, released September 2007.

Maria Eriksson is also half of the band Heikki, with guitarist Jari Haapalainen.  They released their self-titled debut, a mini-CD, in Scandinavia in 2002.  The follow-up, Heikki 2, appeared in 2004.

Lisa Milberg also makes music on her own, under the name Milberg. Her first solo album was released in 2009.

Group members
Current members:
Maria Eriksson – guitar, lead and backup vocals
Martin Hansson – bass, backup vocals
Ulrik Janusson – horns, piano, backup vocals
Lisa Milberg – drums, lead and backup vocals
Dante Kinnunen - drums
Per Nyström – organ, backup vocals
Ludvig Rylander – horns, piano and backing vocals
Daniel Värjö – guitar, mandolin, backup vocals

Former members:
Victoria Bergsman – lead vocals

Discography

Studio albums
The Concretes, released 2003 in Sweden; 2004 internationally.
In Colour,  released 13 March 2006 in the UK; 4 April 2006 in the US.
Hey Trouble, released 2007.
WYWH, released 2010.

Compilations
Boyoubetterunow, released 2000; comprising their first two EPs.
Layourbattleaxedown, released 26 July 2005; b-sides/rarities compilation.

EPs
Limited Edition (1999)
Lipstick Edition (1999)
Nationalgeographic (2001)

Singles
"Forces" (2002)
"You Can't Hurry Love" (2003)
"Warm Night" (2003)
"Say Something New" (2004)
"Seems Fine" (2004)
"Chico" (2004)
"Lady December" (2004)
"Chosen One" (2006)
"On the Radio" (2006)
"Kids" (2007)
"Oh Boy" (2007)
"Keep Yours" (2007)

References

External links
Official site
Interview with Lisa and Ludvig from The Concretes - ZME Music, Jul 14

Astralwerks artists
Swedish indie pop groups
English-language singers from Sweden